The Castle of La Mota or Castillo de La Mota is a medieval fortress, located in the town of Medina del Campo, province of Valladolid, Spain. It is so named because of its location on an elevated hill, a mota (in Spanish), from where it dominates the town and surrounding land. The adjacent town came to be surrounded by an expanding series of walls in subsequent years, of which little remains.

It has been protected by the state since 1904, first as a national monument and more recently as a site of cultural interest, or Bien de Interés Cultural.

Overview
The castle's main feature is the large outer barbican. The interior castle has a trapezoidal plan, with 4 towers and a square yard. It has a large square keep tower, and an inner curtain wall that was used for archers.

The castle was originally accessed through a drawbridge. It is made from local red brick, utilizing stone only for some details.

History 

Initial fortification of the village, repopulated after Moorish depredations, led to the creation of a fortress on the site, starting in 1080. The village soon grew alongside. In 1354, Henry of Trastamara is known to have taken the fortress by force. In 1390 King John I of Castile granted the town to his son, the infante Ferdinand of Antequera, future king of Aragon. After the latter's death in 1416, his son, John II of Aragon, in 1433 taxed local residents to help the construction at the Mota. During the following century, the castle and town changed hands between the rival kings of Castile and Aragon, with the castle and town being sometimes held by opposing sides. In 1439, for example, the prince of Aragon locked the town gates, thereby imprisoning the Castilian king within the castle walls. In 1441, the Castilian king was able to obtain the surrender of some 250 soldiers of Aragon within the castle.

After the First Battle of Olmedo in 1445, the castle came once and for all into hands of the Castilian monarchy. In 1460, King Henry IV of Castile built the central tower. In  1464, Henry gave the castle to the Archbishop of Toledo, Alonso Carrillo, who soon betrayed the king, and backed the rival claimant Afonso V of Portugal. After taking the castle by force, it fell by 1467 into the hands of supporters of King Afonso, while the village supported Henry.

Subsequently, the castle was disputed between the princess claimant, Isabella of Castile and her cousin of dubious paternity, the princess Juana la Beltraneja.

After a succession of owners, in 1475, the crown of Castile reclaimed the castle, and built an artillery bastion, upon whose entrance are the heraldic symbols of the Catholic Monarchs, Ferdinand and Isabella.

The castle became a prominent prison, and variously housed Hernando Pizarro,  Rodrigo Calderón, Duke Fernando de Calabria, and Cesare Borgia, among others. Of these men, the last is known for having escaped from the nearly 40 meter high tower by climbing down a rope.

References

Sources

External links 

News of Castillo de La Mota
History and evolution of the  Castle of La Mota
 

Castles in Castile and León
Bien de Interés Cultural landmarks in the Province of Valladolid
Medina del Campo